Claudia Balderrama Ibañez (born 13 November 1983) is a Bolivian race-walker of partial Aymara ancestry. She was born in Catavi, Llallagua, Potosí, and competed for Bolivia at the 2012 Summer Olympics, finishing 33rd in a new personal best of 1:33:28.

Personal bests

Road walk
20 km walk: 1:33:28 hrs – London, 11 August 2012

Achievements

References

External links

Tilastopaja biography

1983 births
Living people
Bolivian female racewalkers
People from Rafael Bustillo Province
Bolivian people of Aymara descent
Athletes (track and field) at the 2011 Pan American Games
Athletes (track and field) at the 2012 Summer Olympics
Pan American Games competitors for Bolivia
Olympic athletes of Bolivia
World Athletics Championships athletes for Bolivia
Athletes (track and field) at the 2015 Pan American Games